The American Prisoner is a 1929 British drama film directed by Thomas Bentley and starring Carl Brisson, Madeleine Carroll and Cecil Barry. It was adapted from the 1904 novel The American Prisoner by Eden Phillpotts. It was originally conceived as a silent film, but was converted into a Talkie in line with widespread practice at British International Pictures during 1928–1929.

Premise
An American sailor imprisoned on Dartmoor during the American War of Independence manages to escape and fall in love with a local Squire's daughter.

Cast
Carl Brisson as Lt. Stark 
Madeleine Carroll as Grace Malherb 
Cecil Barry as Peter Norcutt 
Carl Harbord as Lt. Burnham 
A. Bromley Davenport as Squire Malherb 
Nancy Price as Lovey Lee 
Reginald Fox as Captain Mainwaring 
Charles Ashton as Carberry 
Harry Terry as Bosun Knapps 
John Valentine as Commander Miller 
Robert English as Col. Governor 
Edward Dignon as Leverett

References

Bibliography
Low, Rachael. The History of the British Film 1929-1939: Film Making in 1930s Britain. George Allen & Unwin, 1985.

External links

1929 films
British historical drama films
Films shot at British International Pictures Studios
1920s English-language films
Films based on British novels
Films directed by Thomas Bentley
1920s historical drama films
Films set in the 18th century
Films set in Devon
British black-and-white films
1929 drama films
American Revolutionary War films
1920s British films